Abdu Cadri Conté (born 24 March 1998) is a Portuguese professional footballer who plays as a central defender or a left-back for Ligue 1 club Troyes.

He represented Sporting CP B, Moreirense and Troyes in his career, making his Primeira Liga debut with the second of those clubs.

Born in Guinea-Bissau, Conté represented Portugal at youth level.

Club career

Sporting CP
Born in Bissau, Conté joined the youth academy of Sporting CP at the age of 13, from Sport Futebol Damaiense. He made his senior debut with the former's reserves on 7 January 2017 while still a junior, playing the second half of the 1–2 home loss against Braga B in the LigaPro.

Conté finished the 2017–18 season with 24 matches – 17 starts – as his team suffered relegation as third from the bottom. He also appeared for the under-23 side before his departure.

Moreirense
On 22 July 2019, Conté signed with Primeira Liga club Moreirense on a four-year contract. He made his debut in the competition on 23 August, playing the entire 0–0 away draw against Vitória de Setúbal.

Conté totalled 67 appearances during his spell at the Parque de Jogos Comendador Joaquim de Almeida Freitas, providing seven assists.

Troyes
On 12 January 2022, Conté joined French club Troyes on a four-and-a-half year deal. He scored his first goal as a senior on 9 October, but in a 3–2 loss at Nice.

International career
Born in Guinea-Bissau, Conté represented Portugal at youth level. He was called by under-21 manager Rui Jorge for the second stage of the 2021 UEFA European Championship in May after Thierry Correia tested positive for COVID-19, earning his first cap on 3 June by featuring 90 minutes in a 1–0 semi-final victory over Spain.

Honours
Portugal U19
UEFA European Under-19 Championship runner-up: 2017

Portugal U21
UEFA European Under-21 Championship runner-up: 2021

Individual
UEFA European Under-19 Championship Team of the Tournament: 2017

References

External links

Portuguese League profile 

1998 births
Living people
Bissau-Guinean emigrants to Portugal
Portuguese sportspeople of Bissau-Guinean descent
Sportspeople from Bissau
Bissau-Guinean footballers
Portuguese footballers
Association football defenders
Primeira Liga players
Liga Portugal 2 players
Sporting CP B players
Moreirense F.C. players
Ligue 1 players
ES Troyes AC players
Portugal youth international footballers
Portugal under-21 international footballers
Portuguese expatriate footballers
Bissau-Guinean expatriate footballers
Expatriate footballers in France
Portuguese expatriate sportspeople in France
Bissau-Guinean expatriate sportspeople in France